This is a list of franchise records for the Calgary Flames of the National Hockey League.

Career

Skaters

Bolded denotes player currently playing for the Flames

Goaltenders

Coaches

Single season records

Team

Skaters

Goaltenders

Career playoff leaders

Skaters

Goaltenders

Coaches
 *Interim Head Coach

Single season playoff records

Team

Players

Single game records

Team

Player

References

External links
 
 
 
 
 

Records
National Hockey League statistical records